Aḥmad III Abū Jaʿfar ibn ʿAbd al-Malik al-Mustanṣir (died 5 February 1146), called Sayf al-Dawla ("Sword of the Dynasty"), Latinised as Zafadola, was the last ruler of the Hudid dynasty. He ruled the rump of the taifa kingdom of Zaragoza from his castle at Rueda de Jalón, in what is now Spain. He was the son of Abd al-Malik.

After the city of Zaragoza was conquered by the Almoravids in 1110, ʿAbd al-Malik and Sayf al-Dawla fled to Rueda to resist the invaders. There they received help from Alfonso the Battler, king of Aragon. Their state was reduced to the towns of Rueda and Borja and their hinterland. In 1130 ʿAbd al-Malik died. In 1131 Sayf al-Dawla sent messengers to the court of King Alfonso VII of León to propose his rendering homage to Alfonso. The latter sent an embassy led by Count Rodrigo Martínez and the king's counsellor Gutierre Fernández de Castro to Rueda to make final arrangements. The taifa king and his sons then went to Alfonso, surrendered Rueda to him and became his vassals. Alfonso in turn gave Sayf al-Dawla territory in the Kingdom of Toledo and the task of defending a sector of the southern frontier from the Almoravids.

Sayf al-Dawla took part in battles with the Almoravids in Jaén, Granada and Murcia, and also fought against Alfonso the Battler. In 1135 he attended Alfonso VII's imperial coronation in León. He was defending the southern border in 1146, when Alfonso VII sent some of his leading knights—Manrique de Lara, Ponce de Cabrera and Armengol de Urgel—to assist him. In a dispute with the Christians, Sayf al-Dawla was killed during the battle of Chinchilla, near Chinchilla de Montearagón.


Notes

Footnotes

Citations

Sources

Further reading

1146 deaths
12th-century Arabs
12th-century rulers in Europe
Banu Hud
Emirs of Zaragoza
Monarchs killed in action